Narvalina is a genus of flowering plants in the dahlia tribe within the sunflower family.

Species
Species
Narvalina domingensis, native to Hispaniola.

formerly included
see Cyathomone Ericentrodea Lasianthaea 
 Narvalina corazonensis Hieron. - Ericentrodea corazonensis (Hieron.) S.F.Blake & Sherff
 Narvalina fruticosa (L.) Urb.	 - Lasianthaea fruticosa (L.) K.M.Becker
 Narvalina homogama Hieron. - Ericentrodea homogama (Hieron.) S.F.Blake & Sherff
 Narvalina sodiroi Hieron. - Cyathomone sodiroi (Hieron.) S.F.Blake

References

External links

Asteraceae genera
Coreopsideae
Monotypic Asteraceae genera
Flora of the Dominican Republic